The 2010 Puerto Rico Soccer League season (officially known as the SúperCopa DirecTV 2010 for sponsorship reasons) was a one-off competition that served as a qualifying tournament for Puerto Rican teams to the 2011 CFU Club Championship. It was won by CA River Plate Ponce, who qualified to the Caribbean tournament alongside the Puerto Rico Islanders FC.

Competition format
For the competition, the eight teams were divided into two groups of four. The teams will play within their group in a double round-robin format. The top two teams from each group advanced to the playoffs, where the winner of each group will play the runner-up of the other group. The playoffs consisted of a semifinal and final stage, each contested over a two legs. The two teams that advance to the final will qualify to the 2011 CFU Club Championship.

Teams

First stage

Group A

Group B

Playoffs

References

External links 
 

Puerto Rico Soccer League seasons
1
Puerto Rican
Puerto Rican